The Soul Explosion is an album by jazz saxophonist Illinois Jacquet which was recorded in 1969 and released on the Prestige label.

Reception

Scott Yanow of Allmusic stated, "This blues-based set is full of soul but often swings quite hard with the focus on Jacquet's exciting tenor throughout".

Track listing 
 "The Soul Explosion" (Gladys Bruce) – 9:17  
 "After Hours" (Mark Gordon, Erskine Hawkins, Avery Parrish) – 7:30  
 "St. Louis Blues" (W. C. Handy) – 3:06  
 "I'm a Fool to Want You" (Joel Herron, Frank Sinatra, Jack Wolf) – 8:53  
 "The Eighteenth Hole" (Bruce) – 3:30  
 "Still King" (Frank Foster, Illinois Jacquet) – 4:07 Bonus track on CD reissue

Personnel 
Illinois Jacquet – tenor saxophone
Russell Jacquet, Joe Newman, Ernie Royal – trumpet
Matthew Gee – trombone
Frank Foster – tenor saxophone
Cecil Payne – baritone saxophone
Milt Buckner – organ, piano, arranger
Wally Richardson – guitar
Al Lucas – bass, electric bass
Al Foster – drums
Jimmy Mundy – arranger

References 

1969 albums
Illinois Jacquet albums
Prestige Records albums
Albums produced by Don Schlitten
Albums recorded at Van Gelder Studio
Albums arranged by Jimmy Mundy